Mentha requienii, or Corsican mint, is a herb and species of mint, native to Corsica, Sardinia,  and Montecristo Island, and naturalized in Portugal and in the British Isles. It is a very low-growing species with bright green leaves and a strong minty aroma.

Description
Corsican mint is one of the smallest members of the mint family. It grows to 3–10 cm tall, with small oval leaves 2–7 mm long and tiny mauve flowers in July and August that are insect pollinated. It has a strong aroma of peppermint.

Distribution
Corsican mint is native to Corsica, Sardinia and the Montecristo island. It has become naturalised in other parts of the world and is regarded as an invasive species in south eastern United States.

Use in the garden
Mentha requienii can be used in landscaping as a bedding plant, giving out a desirable mint smell when trodden on. Because it can indeed be walked upon without dying, it is sometimes used to line walkways, growing between stepping stones. Unlike most other cultivated mints, this plant stays diminutive and thrives in shady garden areas. However, if given too much moisture the leaves will rot. The best way to avoid this is to let the plant dry out between waterings, but not too much, because it is drought-sensitive. Baby's tears is used as a substitute in areas where Corsican mint is too fragile.

Corsican mint, along with pennyroyal, is thought to be one of the best mints to grow as a companion to brassica plants like broccoli, cabbage, cauliflower, et cetera. It repels certain pest insects, in part by obscuring the smell of the crop to be protected, and may also enhance flavor.

Use in the kitchen
This plant is also used in cuisine, most famously as the flavoring in crème de menthe. It is sometimes said to have a scent similar to pennyroyal.

Other uses
In traditional medicine this plant has been used as an antiseptic, a carminative and a febrifuge. The smell of mint is disliked by rats and mice and this plant has been used for strewing on the floor to deter rodents.

References

requienii
Flora of Europe
Plants described in 1833
Medicinal plants
Herbs